Nathaniel Mehr is a leftwing British journalist whose has written for several publications including The Morning Star newspaper and Tribune magazine and Red Pepper.

From 2008 to 2010 Mehr was co-editor of the London Progressive Journal, an online current affairs magazine. His first book, Constructive Bloodbath in Indonesia: The US, Britain and the Mass Killings of 1965-66, was published by Spokesman Books in May 2009.  In January 2011, Spokesman Books published a new edition of J.A. Hobson's seminal work, 'Imperialism: A Study', which featured a new introduction by Nathaniel Mehr.  Nathaniel Mehr is currently an associate editor of Review 31, an online literary magazine that was launched in October 2011.

References

British male journalists
Living people
Year of birth missing (living people)